The liver receptor homolog-1 (LRH-1) also known as totipotency pioneer factor NR5A2 (nuclear receptor subfamily 5, group A, member 2) is a protein that in humans is encoded by the NR5A2 gene. LRH-1 is a member of the nuclear receptor family of intracellular transcription factors.

LRH-1 plays a critical role in the regulation of development, cholesterol transport, bile acid homeostasis and steroidogenesis.

LRH-1 is important for maintaining pluripotence of stem cells during embryonic development.

Interactions 

Liver receptor homolog-1 has been shown to interact with the small heterodimer partner.

References

Further reading

External links 
 

5